Domanove is a border crossing between Belarus and Ukraine, just north of village of Domanove, Ratne Raion, Volyn Oblast.

Overview
Named after village of Domanove that is located nearby.

Across the border on the Belarusian side is a border checkpoint Makrany.

The type of crossing is automobile, status - international. The types of transportation for automobile crossings are passenger and freight.

The port of entry is part of the Domanove customs post of Yahodyn customs.

See also
 State border of Ukraine

References

External links
 State Border Guard of Ukraine website 

Belarus–Ukraine border crossings
Geography of Volyn Oblast